Neutral point of view may refer to:

 Objectivity (science), the concept of a position formed without incorporating one's own prejudice
 Neutrality (philosophy), to maintain neutrality at all times